Adji may refer to:

Boukary Adji (1939–2018), politician from Niger
Oware, an abstract strategy game, for which "Adji" is the Ewe language name

See also
Adjei, a similar name